Windsor—Walkerville was a federal electoral district that was represented in the House of Commons of Canada from 1968 to 1988. It was located in the southwest corner of the province of Ontario. This riding was created in 1966 from parts of Essex East and Essex West ridings. The electoral district was abolished in 1987 when it was merged into Windsor—Lake St. Clair riding, which was later renamed Windsor—St. Clair.
 
Windsor—Walkerville initially consisted of the Town of Tecumseh, the Village of St. Clair Beach and the eastern part of the City of Windsor (including Peche Island). In 1976, the Windsor portion was redefined.

Members of Parliament

This riding has elected the following Members of Parliament:

Election results

|-
  
|Liberal
|Mark MacGuigan
|align="right"|17,090
 
|New Democratic
|Bert Weeks 
|align="right"|12,090 
  
|Progressive Conservative
|David Alexander Gray
|align="right"|5,191

|-
  
|Liberal
|Mark MacGuigan
|align="right"| 17,298
 
|New Democratic
|Fred Alexander
|align="right"| 14,662 
  
|Progressive Conservative
|Richard C. Quittenton
|align="right"|7,208 
 
|Unknown
|Edward McDonald 
|align="right"| 317

  
|Liberal
|Mark MacGuigan
|align="right"|19,009 
 
|New Democratic
|Fred Alexander
|align="right"|13,825 
  
|Progressive Conservative
| Tony Soda
|align="right"|6,752

  
|Liberal
|Mark MacGuigan
|align="right"| 17,561 
 
|New Democratic
|David Burr 
|align="right"|15,744 
  
|Progressive Conservative
|Charlie Pingle 
|align="right"|7,265 

|-
  
|Liberal
|Mark MacGuigan
|align="right"| 20,869 
 
|New Democratic
|John Moynahan
|align="right"|14,460 
  
|Progressive Conservative
|Charlie Pingle
|align="right"| 4,581 

|-
 
|New Democratic
|Howard McCurdy
|align="right"|14,604
  
|Progressive Conservative
|Tom Porter 
|align="right"|13,546   
  
|Liberal
|Terrance Patterson
|align="right"|11,574

See also 
 List of Canadian federal electoral districts
 Past Canadian electoral districts

External links 
 Website of the Parliament of Canada

Politics of Windsor, Ontario
Former federal electoral districts of Ontario